Cardinal Hayes High School is an American Catholic high school for boys in the Concourse Village neighborhood of the Bronx, New York City, New York. The school serves the Roman Catholic Archdiocese of New York. It is a member of the Catholic High School Athletic Association. The building was constructed in the Art Deco style. It is named after Cardinal Patrick Joseph Hayes, a previous archbishop of the Roman Catholic Archdiocese of New York.

History
Cardinal Hayes was dedicated on September 8, 1941, by Archbishop Spellman. Cardinal Hayes' current rival is Mount Saint Michael Academy. The two schools' football teams have met annually since 1942 on Thanksgiving Day. Cardinal Hayes also takes part in non-annual football rivalries with Cardinal Spellman High School and Archbishop Stepinac High School for the Fathers' Club Trophy and the Father John Dubois Memorial Trophy, respectively. Throughout the years, the school has been staffed by Archdiocesan Priests, De la Salle, Xavieran, Marist and Irish Christian Brothers. The school today is largely staffed by lay faculty.

Notable alumni
 George Carlin, stand-up comedian (did not graduate) 
 Stalin Colinet, NFL player, class of 1992
 Willie Colon, NFL champion
 Don DeLillo, author and playwright
 Cartier Diarra, professional basketball player
 Steve Dillon, professional baseball player
 George Dzundza, television and film actor
 John F. Good (1936–2016; class of 1954), FBI agent who created the Abscam sting operation
 David Gonzalez, journalist for The New York Times
 Jim Jones, rapper from group Dipset (did not graduate)
 Damon Lopez, professional basketball player
 Kevin Loughery, NBA player, Detroit Pistons, Baltimore Bullets; player-coach Philadelphia 76ers
 Jamal Mashburn, NBA player, Dallas Mavericks, Miami Heat, and New Orleans Hornets
 Andrew C. McCarthy, columnist and former Assistant U.S. Attorney
 Bernard McGuirk, executive producer of Imus in the Morning radio and television program.
 Richard Mulligan, film, stage and television actor.
 Roscoe Orman, actor (attended briefly)
 George Pérez, illustrator and writer of comic books
 Regis Philbin, television personality
 Mario Runco, Jr., U.S. astronaut and former NASA mission specialist
 Bobby Sanabria, American (Latin jazz) drummer, percussionist, composer, arranger, educator
 Martin Scorsese, Oscar-winning filmmaker
 Lawrence A. Skantze (1928–2018; class of 1946), U.S. Air Force four-star general
 John Sweeney, President AFL–CIO 1995–2009; recipient of the 2010 Presidential Medal of Freedom
 Gerry Ward, basketball player; first-round pick in the 1963 NBA draft

References

External links

 

Boys' schools in New York City
Educational institutions established in 1941
Eggers & Higgins buildings
Roman Catholic high schools in the Bronx
Concourse, Bronx
Art Deco architecture in the Bronx
1941 establishments in New York City